"I Miss You" is a song recorded by Sarah Engels from her first studio album Heartbeat. It features vocals from Pietro Lombardi. It was written and produced by DSDS jury member Dieter Bohlen. The song was released on 17 June 2011.

Music video
A music video to accompany the release of "I Miss You" was first released onto YouTube on 15 June 2011 at a total length of three minutes and thirty-two seconds.

Track listing
Digital download
 "I Miss You" (Single version) - 3:31
 "I Miss You" (Club Mix) - 3:56

Chart performance

Year-end charts

References

2011 singles
Sarah Lombardi songs
Pietro Lombardi (singer) songs
Songs written by Dieter Bohlen
2011 songs